Jean Romaric Kevin Koffi (born 25 June 1986) is an Ivorian professional footballer who plays as a forward for  club SV Elversberg.

Career
A youth product of Modena, Koffi left for Virtus Castelfranco of Serie D in the summer of 2004, a team in the Province of Modena.

In the summer of 2007, Modena re-signed Koffi. After playing three times in 2009–10 Serie B, he was released. In October 2010, he signed for Seconda Divisione side Sanremese, but he was released in December. However on 31 January 2011, he signed for Serie A team Napoli and immediately loaned to Siracusa (swapped with youngster Andrea Petta). It was because when Koffi became a free agent, Napoli would got a non-EU signing from abroad quota to "replace" Koffi.

On 15 August 2011, he signed for another Serie A team, Roma. He moved to the Belgian Second Division side Royal Boussu Dour Borinage on the same day. In the same window, Roma also signed Alain Mendy and released him to Belgium in order to get the non-EU quota.

On 31 January 2014, he signed for Westerlo.

References

External links
 Profile at La Gazzetta dello Sport (2007–08) 
 
 

Living people
1986 births
People from Comoé District
Association football forwards
Ivorian footballers
Belgian Pro League players
Challenger Pro League players
Serie B players
3. Liga players
Regionalliga players
Modena F.C. players
S.S.D. Sanremese Calcio players
U.S. Siracusa players
R.F.C. Seraing (1922) players
K.V.C. Westerlo players
S.S.C. Napoli players
A.S. Roma players
Francs Borains players
RWS Bruxelles players
SV Elversberg players
SV Waldhof Mannheim players
Expatriate footballers in Belgium
Ivorian expatriate sportspeople in Belgium
Expatriate footballers in Italy
Ivorian expatriate sportspeople in Italy
Expatriate footballers in Germany
Ivorian expatriate sportspeople in Germany